NGC 116 is a possibly lost or "non-existent" object in the constellation Cetus. This object is up for debate and has been considered to possibly be PGC 1671. The NED entry for this object contains the note NGC identification is very uncertain.

See also 
List of NGC objects

References

External links 
 

0116
Cetus (constellation)